Sumu Wildlife Park is a small game reserve located in the Sumu forest, Ganjuwa Local Government Area, Bauchi State, Nigeria. It was opened for operation in 2006.

Donations
After opening the park, Namibian government donated a total number of 279  wildlife species to the Bauchi State Government comprising 10 Giraffes, 53 Burchell’s Zebras, 14 Elands, 23 blue Wildebeests, 21 red Hartebeests, 24 Oryxs, 26 Kudus, 52 Springboks and 56 common Impalas.  The animals were gotten from different game reserves in Namibia. They made sure that Sumu was safe for them; it is a fenced and game friendly forest reserve so it’s very suitable for the animals. Game guards and rangers watch over the animals.

References

Game Reserves of Nigeria
Bauchi State
Protected areas established in 2006
Tourist attractions in Bauchi State
2006 establishments in Nigeria
Nature parks in Nigeria